1-Methylamino-1-(3,4-methylenedioxyphenyl)propane or M-ALPHA is an empathogen, reported by Alexander Shulgin in his book PIHKAL as a positional isomer of MDMA, and subsequently found being sold as a designer drug in the UK in 2010, and reported to the EMCDDA new drug monitoring service. It was described by Alexander Shulgin as similar in action to its demethylated homologue, ALPHA, but with roughly twice the duration and twice the potency.

See also
 Filenadol
 Isoethcathinone
 MDA entry in PiHKAL
 Methylenedioxyphencyclidine
 M-alpha-HMCA

References 

Designer drugs
Psychedelic drugs